Kingsway High School is a South African English-medium, co-educational high school situated 2 km north of the Amanzimtoti business centre and less than a kilometre from the shores of the Indian Ocean.

It is designed to cater for up to a thousand learners. The school has State Status, enabling all parents to be involved in the Governing Body and its committees.

History

The school was named in honour of Dick King and his epic ride along the coast. Mention is made of this in the school song.

The original Kingsway High School buildings were in Dartnell Crescent, south of the Amanzimtoti River. Built on a hill, the school commanded a fine view along the coast towards Durban, and was regarded as a showpiece. The building was completed in early 1953. The first learners, formerly at Warner Beach High School, which was then closed down, commenced their studies in the brand new school at the beginning of the second term of 1953. D G Truscott was the first Headmaster.

In 1971 a new school was built north of the river, on drained swampland alongside the Pahla railway halt. The building was designed by Lola Shepherd, the first woman in South Africa to qualify as an architect. She previously designed the new building for her own old school (Mitchell High School, Durban, opened 1902 - transferred to the Shepherd buildings 10 September 1954, but then closed in 1990).

The Pahla site was originally meant to house boys, while the original Kingsway was to be a girls' high school. However, before this could be implemented, a decision was taken to make the original school a Junior High School and the new school Kingsway Senior High School, and both remained co-educational. The institution thus split at the beginning of 1972, with A. E. Larkin intended as the Principal of Kingsway Junior High, standards 6 and 7, and P Bazley (who died before he could take up the post and was replaced by Larkin) as first principal of Kingsway Senior High School, standards 8,9 and 10. The building has since expanded with the additions of a fourth wing and a swimming pool.

The library inherited the junior school's stock, and the first librarian (Frances M. Roberts), aided by her student assistants, set about raising funds for new multimedia by showing children films in the Assembly Hall on Saturday mornings, and running a tuck shop. For the Official Opening day, a natural history exhibition created by the students was displayed in the Library using exhibits loaned from the Durban Museum by Dr. Phillip Clancey. The library boasted one of the country's few Quadraphonic sound systems, and its first Quadraphonic recording was the Columbia production of Leonard Bernstein 's music commission for the September 8, 1971 opening of the John F. Kennedy Center for the Performing Arts, Mass. The first landscaping by the school was the purchase of a sapling - as Vepris lanceolata (supposedly a White Ironwood) - by Mrs Roberts, and planted in the Library courtyard in 1974 by former student Guy H. Best. As a potential pretender to the title, this tree was christened "Anastasia", after Anna Anderson.

In 2017 S du Toit was appointed as the new principal for Kingsway High School.

School symbols 
The school badge is a white shield divided into four by a green cross representing our green heritage. In each quadrant is a red motif. The first is the Lamp of Knowledge and Sacrifice. In the second quadrant are three stars representing the three C's - Character, Citizenship and Courtesy. The third motif is the Fleur de Lys, a symbol of service to others. It embodies the school motto, Ut Prosim. The final symbol is the Anchor, depicting security and steadfastness of purpose.

Student life 
Although the School Cadet's training never transferred to the new site, the strong sports tradition survived and continues.

The first student performances on the well-equipped stage were the musicals The Student Prince and The White Horse Inn. The first play was The Barretts of Wimpole Street. This creative tradition was still going strong with the school's Spring 2015 production of Footloose.

Notable alumni 
 Cassandra Day - South Africa women's national water polo team player
 Deshnie Govender - South African DJ
 Khaya Mthethwa - Idols South Africa winner & gospel music artist and producer
 Clyde Rathbone - Australian national rugby union team player

External links
 Kingsway Website

1953 establishments in South Africa
High schools in South Africa
Schools in KwaZulu-Natal